Jan I the Scholastic (1308/10 – 1372 before 29 September), was a Duke of Oświęcim from 1324 until his death.

He was the eldest child and only son of Duke Władysław of Oświęcim by his wife Euphrosyne, daughter of Duke Boleslaus II of Masovia.

Life
Despite the fact that he was the only heir of his father, Jan was destined since his childhood for a church career. On 15 December 1321 he received the title of Scholastic in Kraków.

After Władysław's death between 1321 and 1324, Jan succeeded him in Oświęcim and in consequence was forced to leave his spiritual career. During the first year of his reign (1324–1325), he was placed under the regency of his mother, the Dowager Duchess Euphrosyne, who remained involved in the government of the Duchy until her death, in 1329.

Even after he left his Church career, Jan continued to receive the revenues generated from his former title of Scholastic in Kraków, which caused the intervention of Pope Gregory XI: Jan was forced to pay 5,000 fines and 500 florins as compensation for damages. The participation of troops who attacked the monasteries of Mogile and Rudy, both in Jan's territory, was not without significance.

In foreign policy, Jan became a faithful ally of the House of Luxembourg. On 24 February 1327, together with the other Piast Dukes, Jan paid homage to King John of Bohemia in Opawa. In 1336, Jan was forced to accept the annexation of the Duchy of Racibórz to the Přemyslid Duchy of Opawa.

In 1355 Jan participated in the Congress of Prague, where a dispute was resolved between the Dukes of Cieszyn and Oleśnica for the division of the Duchy of Bytom. The dispute was only resolved after Jan's mediation in 1369.

Jan died in 1372 (before 29 September) and was buried in the Dominican monastery in Oświęcim. His generosity to the Church was recognized by the Provincial Chapter of Płock in 1372, when prayers for the soul of the deceased Duke were ordered in the whole country.

Marriage and issue
The name of Jan's first wife was unknown. They had one son:
Jan II (b. ca. 1344/51 – d. 19 February 1376).

After 12 July 1359, Jan married secondly Salome (b. ca. 1345/50 – d. aft. 9 November 1400), daughter of Henry II Reuss, Vogt of Plauen. They had no children.

References

14th-century births
1372 deaths
Piast dynasty